Colonel Joseph Frederick Waring was a senior officer of the Confederate States Army, commanding a cavalry regiment in the American Civil War.

Early life and education
Joseph Frederick Waring was born on February 13, 1832, at Savannah, Georgia, to Dr. William R. and Ann Waring. He was the great-uncle of scholar Joseph Frederick Waring. He enrolled in Yale University and graduated in the class of 1852. He spent his studies at Philadelphia and spent the next year travelling across Europe. When he finally returned, he became a planter at Savannah as well as a city alderman there. He then married Louise Early.

American Civil War
When the American Civil War broke out, Waring became a member of the Georgia Hussars and became a colonel within the unit. A few weeks later, he arrived at Virginia with his company and was then originally assigned to the 6th Virginia Infantry Regiment when he arrived at Richmond, Virginia but this didn't last long as shortly after, on December 4, the Bog Wallow Ambush occurred but was wounded in the face during the fighting.

Three days later after the failed ambush, Waring's company was consolidated with the Jeff. Davis Legion after Col. William F. Martin was promoted to Brigadier General and sent to Western Theater of the American Civil War. The unit served under Wade Hampton III. Waring later led his united through cavalry battles in the Eastern Theater of the American Civil War such as Brandy Station, Gettysburg and Trevilian Station. In July 1864, he was promoted to colonel of the Legion and later assisted with Pierce M. B. Young's brigade.

In February 1865, he was assigned to South Carolina to serve in the Campaign of the Carolinas with a worried entry about the campaign of his diary reading:

He participated at the Battle of Monroe's Crossroads but then surrendered at Bennett Place along with Joseph E. Johnston.

Later years
When the war ended, Waring returned to Savannah and took up a job at the Georgia Central Railway Co. as a forwarding agent. He also became a commanding officer of the Georgia Hussars, a post he would have until his death from a yellow fever epidemic after a visit to the Northern States at Whitesville, Georgia.

References

1832 births
1876 deaths
Confederate States Army brigadier generals
People of Georgia (U.S. state) in the American Civil War
Yale University alumni